Brouwer (also Brouwers and de Brouwer) is a Dutch and Flemish surname. The word brouwer means 'beer brewer'.

Brouwer 
 Adriaen Brouwer (1605–1638), Flemish painter
 Alexander Brouwer (b. 1989), Dutch beach volleyball player
 Andries Brouwer (b. 1953), Dutch mathematician and computer programmer
Brouwer–Haemers graph
 Bertha "Puck" Brouwer (1930–2006), Dutch sprinter
 Carolijn Brouwer (b. 1973), Dutch competitive sailor
 Christoph Brouwer (1559–1617), Dutch Catholic ecclesiastical historian
 Cornelis Brouwer (–1681), Dutch Golden Age painter
 Cornelis Brouwer (1900–1952), Dutch long-distance runner
 Dirk Brouwer (1899–1941), Dutch architect and resistance member
 Dirk Brouwer (1902–1966), Dutch-American astronomer
 Brouwer Award, Dirk Brouwer Award, 1746 Brouwer asteroid
 Emanuel Brouwer (1881–1954), Dutch gymnast
 George Brouwer, Australian lawyer, Ombudsman for Victoria
 Gijs Brouwer (b. 1996), Dutch tennis player
 Harm Brouwer (b. 1957), Dutch politician
 Hendrik Brouwer (1580–1643), Dutch explorer, admiral, and colonial administrator
Brouwer Route, route to the East Indies he devised
 Hendrik Albertus Brouwer (1886–1973), Dutch geologist and paleontologist
 Henk Brouwer (b. 1953), Dutch sprinter
 Hugo Brouwer (1913–1986), Dutch painter, sculptor, and ceramist. 
 Ina Brouwer (b. 1950), Dutch politician
 Jan Brouwer (b. 1940), Dutch football manager
 Joel Brouwer (b. 1968), American poet, professor and critic
  (1898–1943), Dutch Hispanist, author, and resistance member
 Jordy Brouwer (b. 1988), Dutch footballer
 L. E. J. Brouwer (1881–1966), Dutch mathematician and philosopher 
Brouwer fixed-point theorem, Brouwer–Heyting–Kolmogorov interpretation, Brouwer–Hilbert controversy, Kleene–Brouwer order, Phragmen–Brouwer theorem
 Leo Brouwer (b. 1939), Cuban guitarist and composer
 Margaret Brouwer (b. 1940), American composer
 Matt Brouwer (b. 1976), Canadian singer/so ngwriter
 Matthijs Brouwer (b. 1980), Dutch field hockey player
 Michael Brouwer (b. 1993), Dutch football goalkeeper
 Miriam Brouwer (b. 1991), Canadian cyclist
 Puck Brouwer (1930–2006), Dutch sprinter
 Rachel Brouwer (b. c. 2001), Canadian inventor
 Rob Brouwer (b. 1982), Canadian rugby player
 Ronald Brouwer (b. 1979), Dutch field hockey player
 Sigmund Brouwer (b. 1959), Canadian writer
  (b. 1991), Dutch swimmer
 Tiemen Brouwer (1916–1977), Dutch politician and Minister of Agriculture 
 Troy Brouwer (b. 1985), Canadian ice hockey player
 Willem Brouwer (b. 1963), Dutch football player
 Willem Coenraad Brouwer (1877–1933), Dutch sculptor and ceramist
 Wouter Brouwer (1882–1961), Dutch fencer

Brouwers 
 Angela Brouwers (b. 1974), Dutch singer
 Davy Brouwers (b. 1988), Belgian footballer
  (1874–1948), Belgian historian and archivist
 Dolf Brouwers (1912–1997), Dutch comedian, singer, and television actor
 Eef Brouwers (1939–2018), Dutch journalist
 Evert Brouwers (b. 1990), Dutch footballer
 Jeroen Brouwers (b. 1940), Dutch writer
 Laura Brouwers (b. 1988), Dutch cricketer
 Luuk Brouwers  (b. 1998), Dutch footballer
 Marco Brouwers  (b. 1958), Dutch volleyball player
 Roel Brouwers  (b. 1981), Dutch footballer

De Brouwer 
 Gordon de Brouwer, Australian economist
 Joëlle De Brouwer (b. 1950), French middle-distance runner
 Ninón Lapeiretta de Brouwer (1907–1989), Dominican composer and pianist
 Piet de Brouwer (1880–1953), Dutch archer 
 Philippe De Brouwer (b. 1969), Belgian economist and banker
 Walter De Brouwer (b. 1957), Belgian internet and technology entrepreneur

See also 
 1746 Brouwer, asteroid
 Brouwer (crater), lunar crater named after both Dirk Brouwer and L.E.J. "Bertus" Brouwer 
 De Dolle Brouwers, Belgian brewery
 De Struise Brouwers, Belgian brewery

Dutch-language surnames
Occupational surnames